Wilhelm of Prussia was the last Crown Prince of the Kingdom of Prussia and the German Empire.

Wilhelm of Prussia may also refer to:

 Prince Wilhelm of Prussia (1783–1851), Knight Grand Cross of the Military William Order
 Prince Wilhelm of Prussia (1906–1940), eldest child and son of Crown Prince Wilhelm of Germany and Duchess Cecilie of Mecklenburg-Schwerin
 Wilhelm I of Prussia (1797–1888), King of Prussia and German Emperor

See also

 August Wilhelm of Prussia (disambiguation)
 Franz Wilhelm of Prussia (born 1943), German businessman and member of the House of Hohenzollern
 Friedrich Wilhelm of Prussia (disambiguation)
 Wilhelm-Karl of Prussia (1922–2007), last surviving grandson of Wilhelm II